Henna Katarina Johansson (born May 1, 1991) is a Swedish wrestler.

She competed at the 2012 Summer Olympics in the 63 kg weight class, winning her first round match against Aisuluu Tynybekova of Kyrgyzstan but lost her quarterfinal match against Kaori Icho of Japan. She finished 10th after losing to Martine Dugrenier of Canada in Repechage round 2. 

She competed in the 63 kg weight class at the 2016 Summer Olympics, where she won her first match against Adéla Hanzlíčková of the Czech Republic and lost her quarterfinal match against Maryia Mamashuk of Belarus. She again finished 10th after losing to Yekaterina Larionova of Kazakhstan in her Repechage round 2 match.

In 2021, she won the gold medal in her event at the 2021 Poland Open held in Warsaw, Poland.

She represented Sweden at the 2020 Summer Olympics in Tokyo, Japan. She competed in the women's freestyle 62 kg event.

References

External links
 

Living people
1991 births
Swedish female sport wrestlers
Wrestlers at the 2012 Summer Olympics
Wrestlers at the 2016 Summer Olympics
Wrestlers at the 2020 Summer Olympics
Olympic wrestlers of Sweden
Wrestlers at the 2015 European Games
European Games competitors for Sweden
World Wrestling Championships medalists
European Wrestling Championships medalists
20th-century Swedish women
21st-century Swedish women